The Hong Kong Central Harbourfront Circuit was a  street circuit on the Central Harbourfront on Hong Kong Island, Hong Kong, facing the Victoria Harbour. It was used for the Hong Kong ePrix of the single-seater, electrically powered Formula E championship. Its first use was on 9 October 2016, as the opening ePrix of the 2016–17 Formula E season and its last use being in 10 March 2019.

Event

Formula E 

The circuit has been used to hold the Hong Kong ePrix in 2016, 2017 and 2019. A total of 4 races were held on this circuit in the 2016–17 season, 2017-18 season and the 2018–19 season. 

The circuit failed to meet regulations set forth by the Fédération Internationale de l'Automobile (FIA). Lawrence Yu, governor of the Hong Kong Automobile Association, cited difficulties in extending the track to the west as the Hong Kong Station on the western side of the circuit links up the city with the airport. An extension to the east of the circuit through a tunnel was considered too dangerous for the cars to be running at high speeds along a straight road before they enter the tunnel.

The Hong Kong ePrix was eventually dropped from the 2019–20 season on the ground of continued protests in the city.

Lap records 
The official race lap records at the Hong Kong Central Harbourfront Circuit are listed as:

Race Winners

References

Formula E circuits
Hong Kong ePrix
Sports venues in Hong Kong
Defunct motorsport venues